WAFD (100.3 FM, "The Summit") is a hot adult contemporary formatted broadcast radio station licensed to Webster Springs, West Virginia, serving East Central West Virginia.  WAFD is owned and operated by Summit Media Broadcasting, LLC. In late 2011, WAFD 100.3 dropped the 1980s format and shifted to a more modern Hot AC station.

External links
100.3 The Summit Online

AFD